Bhaaryaye Aavashyamundu is a 1975 Indian Malayalam film, directed by M. Krishnan Nair. The film stars M. G. Soman, Vincent, Sathaar, Prameela and Magic Raadhika in the lead roles. The film has musical score by M. S. Baburaj.

Cast
 M. G. Soman
 Vincent
 Sathaar
 Alummoodan
 Manavalan Joseph
 K. P. A. C. Sunny
 K. P. A. C. Azeez
 Poojappura Ravi
 Prameela
 Magic Raadhika
 Junior Sheela
 Aranmula Ponnamma 
 Anandavally

Soundtrack
The music was composed by M. S. Baburaj and the lyrics were written by O. N. V. Kurup.

References

1975 films
1970s Malayalam-language films
Films directed by M. Krishnan Nair